Michael Schmaus (17 July 1897 – 8 December 1993) was a German Roman Catholic theologian specializing in dogmatics.

Life

Schmaus was born in Oberbaar, Bavaria.

He was ordained a priest in 1922 and got his doctorate in Catholic Dogmatic Theology under Martin Grabmann in 1924.

After teaching at the Philosophisch-Theologische Hochschule Freising, at the local seminary and at the University of Munich, he was a professor of dogmatic theology at the German-speaking part of the Charles University in Prague (1928–1933) and from 1933 on at the Westfälischen Wilhelms-Universität Münster.

German philosopher Kurt Flasch considers Schmaus and his fellow faculty members Josef Pieper and Joseph Lortz to be the three theologian "pro-Nazi authors" who felt called to make the Catholic population familiar with the compatibility of Catholicism and National Socialism, in an academic way. In 1934, in his Encounters between Catholic Christianity and National Socialist Weltanschauung (Begegnungen zwischen katholischem Christentum und nationalsozialistischer Weltanschauung), Schmaus commented on the connection between Catholicism and National Socialist ideology as follows: "The tablets of National Socialist standards and those of Catholic imperatives point in the same direction." („Die Tafeln des nationalsozialistischen Sollens und die der katholischen Imperative weisen in dieselbe Wegrichtung.“) In his 1941 work Catholic Dogma (Katholische Dogmatik), he referred to "the Jews" as "servants of sin," for which they had "no feeling whatsoever," and as "children, servants of the devil."

From 1946 until his retirement in 1965 he was professor of Catholic dogmatic theology at the Ludwig Maximilian University of Munich. Among his students were Joseph Ratzinger - the future Pope Benedict XVI - with whom he associated with his habilitation for Fundamental Theology, also Gerhard Boß, Josef Finkenzeller, Elisabeth Gössmann, Richard Heinzmann, Stephan Otto, Uta Ranke-Heinemann and Leo Scheffczyk. 

In 1951 to 1952 Schmaus was rektor of the LMU München.

He was peritus (theological expert) for part of the Second Vatican Council.

In 1954 he founded the Martin-Grabmann-Institute for Rescue in Medieval Theology and Philosophy,
in 1955 the scientific journal Münchner Theologische Zeitschrift 

He was best as a synthesizer rather than an originator. His two works on Catholic dogma are still standard works.

He died in Gauting, Upper Bavaria in 1993 and buried in Munich Waldfriedhof.

Honours 
 1951 Member of the Bavarian Academy of Sciences and Humanities, historic and philosophic section
 1952 Member of the Pontificia Academia Mariana Internationalis in Rome
 1952 Member of the Accademia Leonardo Da Vinci Neapel
 1952 Prelate of Honour of His Holiness
 1954  Order of Civil Merit of Spain (Commander / Encomienda)
 1956 Member of the Pontifical Academy of Theology
 1957  Order of the Phoenix (Greece) (Commander)
 1959  Bavarian Order of Merit
 1968  Great Cross of Merit of the Federal Republic of Germany
 1983 Protonotary apostolic appointed by Pope John Paul II. on 12 November 1983
 1983 Günther-Klinge-Kulturpreis of the municipality Gauting
 1984  Bavarian Maximilian Order for Science and Art
 Renaming of the church square in his place of birth Oberbaar to "Prof.-Michael-Schmaus-Platz"

Works 
 Die psychologische Trinitätslehre des hl. Augustinus, (Thesis of Dissertation), 1927.
 Der Liber propugnatorius des Thomas Anglicus und die Lehrunterschiede zwischen Thomas Aquinas und Duns Scotus, II: Die trinitarischen Lehrdifferenzen (= Beiträge zur Geschichte der Philosophie und Theologie des Mittelalters, file 29), Münster 1930 (Thesis of Habilitation.).
 Begegnungen zwischen katholischem Christentum und nationalsozialistischer Weltanschauung, 1934.
 Katholische Dogmatik (Catholic Dogma), 3 volumes, 1938–1941
 Dogma (A different work), 6 volumes 1968, 
 Schmaus, Der Glaube der Kirche

Literature 
All those cited here are in German.
Johann Auer (ed.): Theologie in Geschichte und Gegenwart. Michael Schmaus zum sechzigsten Geburtstag dargebracht von seinen Freunden und Schülern, Verlag Zink, München 1957.
 Leo Scheffczyk (ed.) (et al.): Wahrheit und Verkündigung. Michael Schmaus zum 70. Geburtstag. Paderborn, München, Wien 1967, two files.
 Peter Kollmannsberger: Die schöpfungstheologische Frage nach dem Personsein des Menschen in den Dogmatiken von Michael Schmaus und Johann Auer. Dissertationsschrift (Universität Passau). Schuch, Weiden 1992; 
 Richard Heinzmann: Zum Verhältnis von Kirche und Theologie nach Michael Schmaus, in: Thomas Prügl, Marianne Schlosser (ed.): Kirchenbild und Spiritualität. Dominikanische Beiträge zur Ekklesiologie und zum kirchlichen Leben im Mittelalter (= Festschrift für Ulrich Horst OP zum 75. Geburtstag). Paderborn, München, Wien, Zürich 2007, ISBN 978-3-506-75651-0, S. 421–435.

Links 
 Veröffentlichungen von und über Michael Schmaus im Opac der Regesta Imperii

References

20th-century German Catholic theologians
1897 births
1993 deaths
Commanders Crosses of the Order of Merit of the Federal Republic of Germany
20th-century German Roman Catholic priests